The House of Mansfeld was a princely German house, which took its name from the town of Mansfeld in the present-day state of Saxony-Anhalt. Mansfelds were archbishops, generals, supporters as well as opponents of Martin Luther, and Habsburg administrators.

History

Upon the revolt instigated by the Wettin margrave Dedi I in 1069, Emperor Henry IV appointed the loyal House of Mansfeld counts (Grafen) in the Saxon Hassegau at Eisleben. The family progenitor, Count Hoyer I of Mansfeld, also known as Hoyer the Great, was a field marshal in the service of Emperor Henry V. He was killed at the Battle of Welfesholz on 11 February 1115, fighting the rebellious Saxon forces under Count Lothair of Supplinburg.

The Mansfelds held extended fiefs both in the Archbishopric of Magdeburg and the Bishopric of Halberstadt. The male line became extinct for the first time upon the death of Count Burchard of Mansfeld in 1229; his daughter Sophia married a scion of the Lords of Querfurt, who assumed the comital title. In the 15th century, the primary house divided into cadet branches: Hinterort, Mittelort, and Vorderort, while their County of Mansfeld in 1512 joined the Upper Saxon Circle as an immediate Imperial estate.

Things worsened with the Protestant Reformation: While Count Hoyer VI of Mansfeld-Vorderort (1477-1540) remained a loyal supporter of the Catholic faith, the Mittelort and Hinterort branches sided with Martin Luther. When the county was devastated during the German Peasants' War, Count Albert VII of Mansfeld-Hinterort (1480-1560) not only fought with the Imperial troops in the 1525 Battle of Frankenhausen, but also signed the Protestant Augsburg Confession in 1530 and joined the Schmalkaldic League, wherefore he was banned by Emperor Charles V after the 1547 Battle of Mühlberg.

To settle the enormous debts of the Counts of Mansfeld, their mighty neighbour Elector Augustus of Saxony urged Emperor Maximilian II to appoint a committee. On 15 March 1574, and again on 5 July 1574, in Leipzig and Halle, respectively, the surviving counts Hans Hoyer, Hans Georg, Hans Albrecht and Bruno concluded an agreement for the repayment of debts incurred by Counts Peter Ernst I von Mansfeld-Vorderort, Hans Ernst and Bruno von Mansfeld. The family's assets were confiscated in 1579, whereafter Imperial immediacy was lost and mediatized between the Electorate of Saxony and the Archbishopric of Magdeburg.

The Mittelort and Hinterort branches died out in 1602 and 1666. The male Mansfeld-Vorderort line finally became extinct in 1780 with the death of Josef Wenzel Nepomuk, Prince of Fondi in Italy, and their fiefs fell back to the Electorate of Saxony and the Prussian Duchy of Magdeburg. Josef Wenzel's half-sister and heiress Maria Isabella was only able to retain the Bohemian possessions. In 1771 she had married Prince Franz de Paula Gundaker von Colloredo (1731–1807), last Vice Chancellor of the Holy Roman Empire from 1789, thereby establishing the House of Colloredo-Mansfeld, which claimed headship over the family after the German mediatization.

Notable family members

 Peter Ernst I von Mansfeld-Vorderort (1517–1604), military commander in Spanish Habsburg service, governor of the Spanish Netherlands
 Gebhard I von Mansfeld-Vorderort (c. 1525 – 1562), his brother, Prince-elector and Archbishop of Cologne from 1558
 Karl von Mansfeld (1543–1595), legitimate son of Peter Ernst I, general during the Cologne War and the Ottoman–Habsburg wars 
 Ernst von Mansfeld (c. 1580 – 1626), natural son of Peter Ernst I, military commander of the Protestant Union during the early years of the Thirty Years' War
 Philipp von Mansfeld (1589–1657), second-cousin of Ernst, commanded at first Swedish troops during the Thirty Years' War, from 1633 as Field Marshal of the Holy Roman Empire.
 Agnes von Mansfeld-Eisleben (1551–1637), wife of the Cologne Prince-Archbishop Gebhard Truchsess von Waldburg
 Heinrich Franz von Mansfeld (1640-1715), Prince of Fondi, Austrian diplomat, Field marshal and President of the Hofkriegsrat.

Possessions
 Mansfeld Castle, ancestral seat
 Seeburg
 Heldrungen in Thuringia, purchased in 1479
 Allstedt, former Saxon Kaiserpfalz, acquired by Count Albert VII of Mansfeld in 1526
 La Fontaine Castle, Luxembourg-Clausen, built at the behest of Count Peter Ernst I of Mansfeld from 1563
 Dobříš, Bohemia, acquired in 1630

See also
 Colloredo-Mansfeld

Sources